Several ships have borne the name Niobe, after the figure of Niobe in Greek mythology

 German anti-aircraft cruiser Niobe, ex-, Dutch ship taken over by the Germans during World War II
 , a tall ship used by the German Navy to train cadets which sank during a squall in 1932
 , four ships of the Royal Navy have borne the name HMS Niobe, after the figure of Niobe in Greek mythology
 , was recommissioned in the Royal Navy as HMS Niobe

Niobe

sv:Niobe (fartyg)